Bury Knowsley Street is a former railway station in Bury.

History

The station was first opened by the Lancashire and Yorkshire Railway on 1 May 1848 (as the eastern terminus of the Liverpool and Bury Railway) originally being named simply Bury. There was also a connection from here northwards to neighbouring Bolton Street station on the East Lancashire Railway line from Clifton Junction to Bacup and Accrington. The station was renamed twice: to Bury Market Place in February 1866, and to Bury Knowsley Street in 1888. The line and station were closed on 5 October 1970 as part of continuing cutbacks in British Rail services and the line west to Bolton subsequently dismantled.

Accident
On 19 January 1952, the station footbridge collapsed under the weight of a large crowd entering the station following a football match. Two people were killed and 173 injured when the metal struts supporting the bridge's footway failed. No trains were in the station at the time.

The accident report determined that while the bridge's design was adequate, it had been inadequately maintained and the metal struts which failed had almost certainly required replacement for 10 or 15 years prior to the accident.

Current
There is no physical trace of the station buildings (which were demolished soon after passenger services ended) or the disused platforms (these survived until the early 1990s).  The line from Bury Bolton Street to Heywood through the station site was reopened in 2003 by the East Lancashire Railway.  This had stayed open to freight (along with the old ELR route to Rawtenstall) until December 1980 and had previously (from March 1980 until final closure) crossed what is now the Manchester Metrolink line to Bury Interchange (though it was still BR-operated at that time) on the level.  In order to reopen the route, a bridge (with steep approach gradients on either side known locally as the ski-jump) was constructed in the early 1990s and opened to traffic in July 2003 to carry the ELR line over the Metrolink and this now occupies the old station site.

The route towards Bolton is now overgrown and derelict and has been blocked at Bradley Fold by a housing development.

References

External links
Railscot - Photos of Bury Knowsley Street

Disused railway stations in the Metropolitan Borough of Bury
Former Lancashire and Yorkshire Railway stations
Railway stations in Great Britain opened in 1848
Railway stations in Great Britain closed in 1970
Buildings and structures in Bury, Greater Manchester
1952 disasters in the United Kingdom